The 1978 Men's Hockey Champions Trophy was the 1st edition of the Hockey Champions Trophy, an international men's field hockey tournament. It took place from 17–24 November 1978 in Lahore, Pakistan.

Tournament

Final table

Results

Winning squad

References

Champions Trophy (field hockey)
Champions Trophy
Hockey Champions Trophy
International field hockey competitions hosted by Pakistan
Sport in Lahore
20th century in Lahore
Hockey Champions Trophy